This is a list of songs which reached number one on the Billboard Mainstream Top 40 (or Pop Songs) chart in 2010.

During 2010, a total of 17 singles hit number-one on the charts.

Chart history

See also
2010 in music

References

External links
Current Billboard Pop Songs chart

Billboard charts
Mainstream Top 40 2010
United States Mainstream Top 40